Andrzej Jakubowicz (born 1958) is a Polish former international table tennis player.

He won a bronze medal at the 1985 World Table Tennis Championships in the Swaythling Cup (men's team event) with Andrzej Grubba, Stefan Dryszel, Leszek Kucharski and Norbert Mnich for Poland.

He also won two European Table Tennis Championships medals in 1984 and 1986.

See also
 List of table tennis players
 List of World Table Tennis Championships medalists

References

Polish male table tennis players
Living people
1958 births
World Table Tennis Championships medalists